Robert B. "Bob" Smith was the mayor of Newport News, Virginia from September 1, 1956 to June 30, 1958. Prior to serving as mayor, Smith had served as the head of the news operation for the city's Daily Press and Times-Herald newspapers. In 1946, he served as an officer for the city's Golden Anniversary celebration, commemorating 50 years since the city's incorporation.

References

Mayors of Newport News, Virginia
Year of death missing
Year of birth missing